The Roscoe River is a waterway located above the Arctic Circle on the mainland of Northern Canada.

The river passes through the Melville Hills and Tuktut Nogait National Park in the Northwest Territories, before emptying into Amundsen Gulf at its juncture with Dolphin and Union Strait, between Deas Thompson Point and Tysoe Point.

History
During the Stefánsson-Anderson Arctic expedition of 1908–12, expedition party members found Inuit village ruins near the river.

See also
List of rivers of the Northwest Territories
List of rivers of Nunavut

References

 Information on Roscoe River from the Atlas of Canada

Rivers of Kitikmeot Region
Rivers of the Northwest Territories